Escapology is the fifth studio album recorded by British singer-songwriter Robbie Williams. It was released on 18 November 2002 through EMI Records. The album features a guest appearance by singer Rose Stone and was produced by Guy Chambers and Steve Power. Escapology was preceded by the lead single "Feel", which was released on 2 December 2002. The track was an international hit, reaching the top of the charts in Austria, Poland, Germany, Italy, the Netherlands, and top five positions in countries such as Denmark, Ireland and the United Kingdom. Three other singles from the album were released: "Come Undone", "Something Beautiful" and "Sexed Up".

The album debuted at number one in the United Kingdom with first-week sales of over 264,000, becoming Williams' fifth consecutive number one.

The album was supported by the 2003 Tour, which started on 28 June 2003 in Edinburgh, Scotland and ended on 14 December 2003 in Sydney, Australia. During the tour Williams performed three consecutive shows at Knebworth, England on 1–3 August 2003. The three shows attracted a total of 375,000 fans, becoming the "biggest music event in British history".

Background
In 2002, Williams signed a record-breaking £80 million contract with EMI. The contract included a number of provisos, including the label ceding greater creative control to the artist and a commitment to breaking Williams in the American market. In return, EMI affirmed they would benefit from a cut of Williams' non-recording activities, including touring, publishing, and merchandising, thus protecting the company from any commercial downturn in the singer's album sales. So far it is the biggest music deal in British history.

After a year out from recording, Williams began working on what would be his fifth studio album. The album heralded a new era for Williams, as he had taken a more active role in the making of the album, giving an indication of his growing confidence in the studio. "One Fine Day", "Nan's Song" and "Come Undone" were the first three songs that Robbie wrote without Guy Chambers' input. The majority of the album was recorded in Los Angeles. Escapology was arguably conceived as a concept album, due to its lyrical content being totally reflective of Williams' life as a popstar. The album focuses on his hopes, fears and depression over the search of love.

As the contract stated, EMI attempted to break Williams in the American market; to this end the label asked him to tweak Escapology to suit the market. The American release shuffled the song order, removed "Song 3", "Hot Fudge", "Cursed" and one hidden track, added "Get a Little High" and "One Fine Day", and made "How Peculiar (Reprise)" a main album track instead of a hidden track. Williams promoted the album on shows such as Good Morning America, Last Call with Carson Daly and The Tonight Show. This version of the album won the award for Best Album by a Solo Male in the International Category at the Premios Oye! in Mexico.

Reception

Initial critical response to Escapology was generally mixed. Metacritic, which assigns a normalised rating out of 100 to reviews from mainstream critics, the album has received an average score of 53, based on 11 reviews.

Chart performance
Escapology debuted at number one in the United Kingdom on sales of 264,104, becoming Williams' fifth consecutive number-one album. It also reached number one in Ireland, Germany, Sweden, Finland, Switzerland, Denmark and Austria. It also reached the top ten in other European countries. However, it failed to make an impact in the United States, only reaching number forty-three on the Billboard albums chart. Escapology became the best selling album of 2002 in the United Kingdom, selling 1.2 million copies, and being certified 6× Platinum by the BPI in December 2003, becoming the sixtieth best selling album of all time in the UK. The album sold over 6.5 million copies worldwide, and over 2 million copies in the UK alone.

Singles
 "Feel", a track written by Williams and Chambers, was released as the album's first single. Originally only recorded as a demo in 1999, Williams attempted to re-record the vocals in 2002, however, felt unsatisfied with the result, and thus decided to issue the original demo version instead. When the single was released in late 2002, it became a massive worldwide hit for Williams and reached top ten in most of the European countries. It also topped the charts in Argentina, Italy, Hungary, Latvia, Portugal, Mexico, and the Netherlands. The success of the song was so massive that it spent 54 weeks inside the Canadian charts. The video for the song received attention in the United States, due to Hollywood actress Daryl Hannah appearing as his love interest, leading radio stations to play the track.
 "Come Undone", the album's second single, became a top ten hit around the world. However, the video for the song was heavily censored by MTV Networks for depicting Williams having three-way sex with two women. The video also highlighted graphic images of people vomiting and fist fighting, a cockroach crawling out of a person's mouth, and close-up shots of maggots, snakes and insects in close contact with the party goers in the video. The uncensored version of the video was released via a DVD single in Europe, and was also included on the Enhanced CD single. BBC Radio 2 also banned the song for its explicit content. During such furors, it was confirmed that Williams and Guy Chambers were to officially part ways.
 "Something Beautiful", a song which was first offered to Tom Jones, was released as the album's third single. After given to Williams, it was reworked and heavily remixed. The single was released in the summer of 2003, and while it hit the top ten in the United Kingdom, New Zealand, Ireland and Denmark, it failed to make an impact in the world charts. The video included a casting in which people from all over Europe contested to win the chance to perform as Robbie Williams at the end of the video. The three winners had the chance to meet Robbie, and three different versions of the video were released to different parts of the world including the different winners.
 "Sexed Up" was released as the album's fourth and final single, becoming another top ten single for Williams in the United Kingdom. However, it failed to make an impact in the charts elsewhere, the exception being Brazil where it became very popular and gained massive radio airplay for being part of a soap opera soundtrack.

Track listing
All the songs produced by Guy Chambers and Steve Power.

Charts

Weekly charts

Year-end charts

Decade-end charts

Certifications and sales

References

2002 albums
Robbie Williams albums
EMI Records albums
Albums recorded at Capitol Studios